White Collar: The American Middle Classes is a study of the American middle class by the sociologist  C. Wright Mills, first published in 1951. It describes the forming of a "new class": the white-collar workers. It is also a major study of social alienation in the modern world of advanced capitalism, where cities are dominated by "salesmanship mentality". The issues in this book were close to Mills' own background, his father was an insurance agent and he himself, at that time, worked as a white-collar research worker in a bureaucratic organization, at Paul Lazarsfeld's Bureau for Social Research at Columbia University. From this point of view, it is probably Mills' most private book. The familiarity with the studied object as a lived matter refers with no doubt to Mills himself and his own experiences.

As Mills described it:

References

External links
 White Collar: The American Middle Classes in Internet Archive

1951 non-fiction books
American middle class
Books by C. Wright Mills
Oxford University Press books
Political science books
Sociology books